Greetings From The Shore is a 2007 American coming-of-age romantic comedy film directed by Greg Chwerchak. The movie has played over 60 festivals, winning over 20 awards. It had its American theatrical release on September 12, 2008, on a limited basis.

The film is set (and was shot) on the New Jersey shore, mainly in Lavallette.

Plot
Still reeling from the death of her father, a young girl spends one last summer at the Jersey Shore before heading off to college. But when her plans fall apart, the girl stumbles into a mysterious world of Russian sailors, high-stakes gambling, and unexpected love.

Cast
 Kim Shaw as Jenny Chambers
 Paul Sorvino as Catch Turner
 David Fumero as Benicio Aceveda
 Jay O. Sanders as Commodore Callaghan
 Andrew Shaifer as Flip Dooley
 Lars Arentz-Hansen as Lars Ramkildestrom
 Gideon Emery as Sasha Mientkiewicz
 Ron Geren as Christos Zazavich
 Cristin Milioti as Didi
 Alexander Cendese as Owen Callaghan

Reception

Critical response
When the film was released Neil Genzlinger, the film critic of The New York Times, was critical of the actors experience, writing, "The problem with having a big-name actor in your small film is that he tends to underscore the inexperience of some of your other stars. That’s the effect Paul Sorvino has in Greetings From the Shore, a watchable-enough summer-at-the-beach tale billed as Gabrielle Berberich’s first feature as writer and producer...until Mr. Sorvino, a real actor and a good one, shows up. He plays a down-on-his-luck fisherman who takes the girl under his wing, and he makes Ms. Shaw and some of the other cast members look like amateurs. The director, Greg Chwerchak (who also gets a writing credit), doesn’t help; he allows several secondary characters to become thudding clichés, trampling the delicate story."

Film critics Frederic and Mary Ann Brussat of the web based Spirituality & Practice, discussed the basic theme of the film, "Jenny's summer teaches her to go with the flow when her life plan is upset. She also learns that the universe is set up in such a felicitous way that when a door closes, a window opens."

Critic David Hiltbrand liked the film, writing, "It's a formulaic and familiar plot, the Jersey girl version of The Flamingo Kid. But it unfolds smoothly, thanks to Greg Chwerchak's focused direction. And the water down on Barnegat Inlet Island looks oddly idyllic on film. Greetings From the Shore is well-acted, including by newcomer Shaw, who has an appealing, wide-eyed innocence reminiscent of a young Meg Ryan. This is a two-hankie weeper that doesn't really earn its tears. But it's a sweet little movie nonetheless."

Awards
Wins
 Bare Bones International Film Festival, 2008 - Won, Festival Recognition: Instrumental Score - Jim Latham
 Columbus International Film & Video Festival, 2007 - Won, Bronze Plaque Award: Entertainment - Greg Chwerchak
 Great Lakes Film Festival, 2007 - Won, Grand Jury Prize: Best Narrative Feature; Best of the Fest; Best Director - Greg Chwerchak; Best Lead Actress - Kim Shaw
 Red Rock Film Festival, 2007 - Won, Audience Award: Best Narrative Feature - Gabrielle Berberich, Greg Chwerchak
 Wild Rose Independent Film Festival, 2007 - Won, WRIFF Award: Best Acting Ensemble, Best Screenplay, Best Feature, Best Director of a Feature, Certificate of Distinctive Achievement: Best Sound, Best Cinematography/Videography, Best Actress, Best Actor, Best Editing
 Fargo Film Festival, 2008 - Won, Best Narrative Feature, Best Screenplay - Gabrielle Berberich, Greg Chwerchak
 Garden State Film Festival, 2008 - Won, Audience Award: Pick of the Flicks; Home Grown Award: Best Feature - Gabrielle Berberich, Greg Chwerchak
 George Lindsey UNA Film Festival, 2008 - Won, Honorable Mention: Professional Full-Length Feature
 Tupelo Film Festival, 2008 - 2nd Place, Festival Prize: Best Feature - Gabrielle Berberich, Greg Chwerchak
 WorldFest-Houston International Film Festival, 2008 - Won, Special Jury Award: Best Feature - Gabrielle Berberich, Greg Chwerchak

References

External links
 
 Paul Sorvino discusses Greetings From The Shore at Fox News

2007 films
2007 romantic comedy films
American coming-of-age comedy films
Films set in the 2000s
Films set in New Jersey
Films shot in New Jersey
2000s English-language films
2000s American films